Group 3 of the 1966 FIFA World Cup consisted of holders Brazil, Hungary, Portugal, and Bulgaria. Play began on 12 July 1966 and concluded on 20 July 1966. World Cup newcomers Portugal won the group, Hungary finished as runners-up, and both advanced to the quarter-finals. Meanwhile, Bulgaria and defending Champions Brazil failed to advance.

Standings

Matches

Brazil vs Bulgaria

|valign="top" width="50%"|

|}

Portugal vs Hungary

|valign="top" width="50%"|

|}

Hungary vs Brazil

|valign="top" width="50%"|

|}

Portugal vs Bulgaria

|valign="top" width="50%"|

|}

Portugal vs Brazil

|valign="top" width="50%"|

|}

Hungary vs Bulgaria

|valign="top" width="50%"|

|}

References

External links
 1966 FIFA World Cup archive

1966 FIFA World Cup
Hungary at the 1966 FIFA World Cup
Bulgaria at the 1966 FIFA World Cup
Portugal at the 1966 FIFA World Cup
Brazil at the 1966 FIFA World Cup